Drug interactions occur when a drug's mechanism of action is affected by the concomitant administration of substances such as foods, beverages, or other drugs. The cause is often inhibition of, or less effective action, of the specific receptors available to the drug. This influences drug molecules to bind to secondary targets, which may result in an array of unwanted side-effects. 

The term selectivity describes a drug’s ability to target a single receptor, rendering a predictable physiological response. For example, the binding of acetylcholine to muscarinic tracheal smooth-muscle receptors (M3) results in smooth muscle contractions. 

When freely binding receptors interact with agonist- chemicals that activate receptors - and antagonists- that inhibit/ block activation - the opportunity for selective drugs to bind with the intended receptor cells decreases as most receptors are already accounted for. Therefore, the drugs are more likely to bind to other receptors relative to the intended receptor, causing different effects.

For example, consuming both Zolpidem (i.e., Ambien) and alcohol together, both which affect the GABAA receptors, results in the overstimulation of this receptor, which can lead to loss of consciousness. The risk of a drug-drug interaction (DDI) increases with the number of drugs used. Over a third (36%) of the elderly in the U.S. regularly use five or more medications or supplements, and 15% are at risk of a significant drug-drug interaction.

Based on pharmacodynamics 

Drug interactions can be additive (the result is what you expect when you add together the effect of each drug taken independently), synergistic (combining the drugs leads to a larger effect than expected), or antagonistic (combining the drugs leads to a smaller effect than expected). On some occasions, it is difficult to distinguish between synergistic or additive interactions, since the individual effects of each drug may vary from patient to patient. A synergistic interaction may be beneficial for patients, but may also increase the risk of overdose. Drug interaction predictors enable risk assessment of multiple drugs simultaneously with visualizations of risk per therapeutic class, to indicate a spectrum from no risk to high risk.

Both synergy and antagonism can occur during different phases of the interaction between a drug and an organism. The different responses of a drug receptor have resulted in several classifications, such as partial agonist, competitive agonist, an inverse agonist. These concepts have fundamental applications in the pharmacodynamics of these interactions. The proliferation of existing classifications at this level and lack of knowledge around drug mechanisms means that it is difficult to offer a clear classification for these concepts. It is possible that authors would misapply any given classification.

Direct interactions between drugs are also possible and may occur when two drugs are mixed before intravenous injection. For example, mixing Thiopentone and Suxamethonium can lead to the precipitation of thiopentone.

The change in an organism's response upon administration of a drug is an important factor in pharmacodynamic interactions. These changes are extraordinarily difficult to classify given the wide variety of modes of action that exist, and the fact that many drugs can cause their effect through several different mechanisms. This wide diversity also means that in all but the most obvious cases, it is important to investigate and understand these mechanisms. A well-founded suspicion exists that there are more unknown interactions than known ones.

Pharmacodynamic interactions can occur on:
Pharmacological receptors: Receptor interactions are the most easily defined, but they are also the most common. From a pharmacodynamic perspective, two drugs can be considered to be:
Homodynamic, if they act on the same receptor. They, in turn, can be:
Pure agonists, if they bind to the main locus of the receptor, causing a similar effect to that of the main drug.
 Partial agonists if, on binding to one of the receptor's secondary sites, they have the same effect as the main drug, but with a lower intensity.
 Antagonists, if they bind directly to the receptor's main locus but their effect is opposite to that of the main drug. These include:
 Competitive antagonists, if they compete with the main drug to bind with the receptor. The amount of antagonist or main drug that binds with the receptor will depend on the concentrations of each one in the plasma.
 Uncompetitive antagonists, when the antagonist binds to the receptor irreversibly and is not released until the receptor is saturated. In principle, the quantity of antagonist and agonist that binds to the receptor will depend on their concentrations. However, the presence of the antagonist will cause the main drug to be released from the receptor regardless of the main drug's concentration, therefore all the receptors will eventually become occupied by the antagonist.
 Heterodynamic competitors, if they act on distinct receptors.
 Signal transduction mechanisms: these are molecular processes that commence after the interaction of the drug with the receptor. For example, it is known that hypoglycaemia (low blood glucose) in an organism produces a release of catecholamines, which trigger compensation mechanisms thereby increasing blood glucose levels. The release of catecholamines also triggers a series of symptoms, which allows the organism to recognize what is happening and which act as a stimulant for preventative action (eating sugars). Should a patient be taking a drug such as insulin, which reduces glycemia, and also be taking another drug such as certain beta-blockers for heart disease, then the beta-blockers will act to block the adrenaline receptors. This will block the reaction triggered by the catecholamines should a hypoglycaemic episode occur. Therefore, the body will not adopt corrective mechanisms and there will be an increased risk of a serious reaction resulting from the ingestion of both drugs at the same time.
 Antagonistic physiological systems: where drugs taken together cause adverse reactions because the effect of one substance is indirectly increased in the presence of another. This can occur when a certain drug, which increases the presence of a physiological substance, is introduced into a system with another drug that is amplified by the same substance. An actual example of this interaction is found in the concomitant use of digoxin and furosemide. The former acts on cardiac fibers and its effects are increased if there are low levels of potassium (K) in blood plasma. Furosemide is a diuretic that lowers arterial tension but favors the loss of K+. This could lead to hypokalemia (low levels of potassium in the blood), which could increase the toxicity of digoxin.

Based on pharmacokinetics 
Modifications in the effect of a drug are caused by differences in the absorption, transport, distribution, metabolism, or excretion of one or both of the drugs compared with the expected behaviour of each drug when taken individually. These changes are modifications in the concentration of the drugs. In this respect, two drugs can be homergic if they have the same effect on the organism and heterergic if their effects are different.

Absorption

Changes in motility 
Some drugs, such as prokinetic agents, increase the speed with which a substance passes through the intestines. If a drug is present in the digestive tract's absorption zone for a short amount of time, its blood concentration will decrease. The opposite will occur with drugs that decrease intestinal motility.

 pH: Drugs can be present in either ionized or non-ionized form, depending on their pKa (pH at which the drug reaches equilibrium between its ionized and non-ionized form). The non-ionized forms of drugs are usually easier to absorb because they will not be repelled by the lipidic bilayer of the cell, most of them can be absorbed by passive diffusion, unless they are too large or polarized (like glucose or vancomycin), in which case they may or may not have specific and non-specific transporters distributed on the entire intestine internal surface, that carries drugs inside the body. Obviously increasing the absorption of a drug will increase its bioavailability, so, changing the drug's state between ionized or not can be useful for certain drugs.

Certain drugs require an acid stomach pH for absorption. Others require the basic pH of the intestines. Any modification in the pH could change this absorption. In the case of antacids, an increase in pH can inhibit the absorption of other drugs such as zalcitabine (absorption can be decreased by 25%), tipranavir (25%) and amprenavir (up to 35%). However, this occurs less often than an increase in pH causes an increase in absorption. Such occurs when cimetidine is taken with didanosine. In this case, a gap of two to four hours between taking the two drugs is usually sufficient to avoid the interaction.
 Drug solubility: The absorption of some drugs can be drastically reduced if they are administered together with food with high-fat content. This is the case for oral anticoagulants and avocado.
 Formation of non-absorbable complexes:
Chelation: The presence of di- or trivalent cations can cause the chelation of certain drugs, making them harder to absorb. This interaction frequently occurs between drugs such as tetracycline or the fluoroquinolones and dairy products (due to the presence of Ca++).
 Binding with proteins. Some drugs such as sucralfate binds to proteins, especially if they have a high bioavailability. For this reason its administration is contraindicated in enteral feeding.
 Finally, another possibility is that the drug is retained in the intestinal lumen forming large complexes that impede its absorption. This can occur with cholestyramine if it is associated with sulfamethoxazol, thyroxine, warfarin or digoxin.
 Acting on the P-glycoprotein of the enterocytes: This appears to be one of the mechanisms promoted by the consumption of grapefruit juice in increasing the bioavailability of various drugs, regardless of its demonstrated inhibitory activity on first pass metabolism.

Based on transport and distribution
The main interaction mechanism is competition for plasma protein transport. In these cases the drug that arrives first binds with the plasma protein, leaving the other drug dissolved in the plasma, which modifies its concentration. The organism has mechanisms to counteract these situations (by, for example, increasing plasma clearance), which means that they are not usually clinically relevant. However, these situations should be taken into account if other associated problems are present such as when the method of excretion is affected.

Based on metabolism 

Many drug interactions are due to alterations in drug metabolism. Further, human drug-metabolizing enzymes are typically activated through the engagement of nuclear receptors. One notable system involved in metabolic drug interactions is the enzyme system comprising the cytochrome P450 oxidases.

CYP450 
Cytochrome P450 is a very large family of haemoproteins (hemoproteins) that are characterized by their enzymatic activity and their role in the metabolism of a large number of drugs. Of the various families that are present in humans, the most interesting in this respect are the 1, 2 and 3, and the most important enzymes are CYP1A2, CYP2C9, CYP2C19, CYP2D6, CYP2E1 and CYP3A4.
The majority of the enzymes are also involved in the metabolism of endogenous substances, such as steroids or sex hormones, which is also important should there be interference with these substances. The function of the enzymes can either be stimulated (enzyme induction) or inhibited (enzyme inhibition).

Through enzymatic inhibition 
If drug A is metabolized by a cytochrome P450 enzyme and drug B inhibits or decreases the enzyme's activity, then drug A will remain with high levels in the plasma for longer as its inactivation is slower. As a result, enzymatic inhibition will cause an increase in the drug's effect. This can cause a wide range of adverse reactions.

It is possible that this can occasionally lead to a paradoxical situation, where the enzymatic inhibition causes a decrease in the drug's effect: if the metabolism of drug A gives rise to product A2, which actually produces the effect of the drug. If the metabolism of drug A is inhibited by drug B, the plasma concentration of A2 will decrease and so will the final effect of the drug.

Through enzymatic induction 
If drug A is metabolized by a cytochrome P450 enzyme and drug B induces or increases the enzyme's activity, then blood plasma concentrations of drug A will quickly fall as its inactivation will take place more rapidly. As a result, enzymatic induction will cause a decrease in the drug's effect.

As in the previous case, it is possible to find paradoxical situations where an active metabolite causes the drug's effect. In this case, the increase in active metabolite A2 (following the previous example) produces an increase in the drug's effect.

It can often occur that a patient is taking two drugs that are enzymatic inductors; one inductor and the other inhibitor ;or both inhibitors, which greatly complicates the control of an individual's medication and the avoidance of possible adverse reactions.

An example of this is shown in the following table for the CYP1A2 enzyme, which is the most common enzyme found in the human liver. The table shows the substrates (drugs metabolized by this enzyme) and the inductors and inhibitors of its activity:

Enzyme CYP3A4 is the most commonly used substrate in a great number of drugs. Over a hundred drugs depend on its metabolism for their activity and many others act on the enzyme as inductors or inhibitors.

Some foods also act as inductors or inhibitors of enzymatic activity. The following table shows the most common:

Any study of pharmacological interactions between particular medicines should also discuss the likely interactions of some medicinal plants. The effects caused by medicinal plants should be considered in the same way as those of medicines as their interaction with the organism gives rise to a pharmacological response. Other drugs can modify this response and also the plants can give rise to changes in the effects of other active ingredients. 

There is little data available regarding interactions involving medicinal plants for the following reasons:

 False sense of security regarding medicinal plants. The interaction between a medicinal plant and a drug is usually overlooked due to a belief in the "safety of medicinal plants."
 Variability of composition, both qualitative and quantitative. The composition of a plant-based drug is often subject to wide variations due to a number of factors such as seasonal differences in concentrations, soil type, climatic changes, or the existence of different varieties of chemical races within the same plant species that have variable compositions of the active ingredient. On occasion, an interaction can be due to just one active ingredient, but this can be absent in some chemical varieties or it can be present in low concentrations, which will not cause an interaction. Counter interactions can even occur. This occurs, for instance, with ginseng, the Panax ginseng variety increases the Prothrombin time, while the Panax quinquefolius variety decreases it.
 Absence of use in at-risk groups, such as hospitalized and polypharmacy patients, who tend to have the majority of drug interactions.
 Limited consumption of medicinal plants has given rise to a lack of interest in this area.

They are usually included in the category of foods as they are usually taken as tea or food supplement. However, medicinal plants are increasingly being taken in a manner more often associated with conventional medicines: pills, tablets, capsules, etc.

Based on excretion

Renal excretion 

Only the free fraction of a drug that is dissolved in the blood plasma can be removed through the kidney. Therefore, drugs that are tightly bound to proteins are not available for renal excretion, as long as they are not metabolized when they may be eliminated as metabolites.
Creatinine clearance is used as a measure of kidney functioning but it is only useful in cases where the drug is excreted in an unaltered form in the urine. The excretion of drugs from the kidney's nephrons has the same properties as that of any other organic solute: passive filtration, reabsorption, and active secretion. In the latter phase, the secretion of drugs is an active process that is subject to conditions relating to the saturability of the transported molecule and competition between substrates. Therefore, these are key sites where interactions between drugs could occur.
Filtration depends on a number of factors including the pH of the urine, it having been shown that the drugs that act as weak bases are increasingly excreted as the pH of the urine becomes more acidic, and the inverse is true for weak acids. This mechanism is of great use when treating intoxications (by making the urine more acidic or more alkali) and it is also used by some drugs and herbal products to produce their interactive effect.

Bile excretion 
Bile excretion is different from kidney excretion as it always involves energy expenditure in active transport across the epithelium of the bile duct against a concentration gradient. This transport system can also be saturated if the plasma concentrations of the drug are high. Bile excretion of drugs mainly takes place where their molecular weight is greater than 300 and they contain both polar and lipophilic groups. The glucuronidation of the drug in the kidney also facilitates bile excretion. Substances with similar physicochemical properties can block the receptor, which is important in assessing interactions. A drug excreted in the bile duct can occasionally be reabsorbed by the intestines (in the enterohepatic circuit), which can also lead to interactions with other drugs.

With herbal medicines 
Herb-drug interactions are drug interactions that occur between herbal medicines and conventional drugs. These types of interactions may be more common than drug-drug interactions because herbal medicines often contain multiple pharmacologically active ingredients, while conventional drugs typically contain only one. Some such interactions are clinically significant, although most herbal remedies are not associated with drug interactions causing serious consequences. Most herb-drug interactions are moderate in severity. The most commonly implicated conventional drugs in herb-drug interactions are warfarin, insulin, aspirin, digoxin, and ticlopidine, due to their narrow therapeutic indices. The most commonly implicated herbs involved in such interactions are those containing St. John’s Wort, magnesium, calcium, iron, or ginkgo.

Examples 
Examples of herb-drug interactions include, but are not limited to:

 St. John's wort affects the clearance of numerous drugs, including cyclosporin, SSRI antidepressants, digoxin, indinavir, and phenprocoumon. It may also interact with the anti-cancer drugs irinotecan and imatinib.
 Salvia miltiorrhiza may enhance anticoagulation and bleeding among people taking warfarin.
 Allium sativum has been found to decrease the plasma concentration of saquinavir, and may cause hypoglycemia when taken with chlorpropamide.
 Ginkgo biloba can cause bleeding when combined with warfarin or aspirin.
 Concomitant Ephedra and caffeine use has been reported to, in rare cases, cause fatalities.

Mechanisms 
The mechanisms underlying most herb-drug interactions are not fully understood. Interactions between herbal medicines and anticancer drugs typically involve enzymes that metabolize cytochrome P450. For example, St. John's Wort has been shown to induce CYP3A4 and P-glycoprotein in vitro and in vivo.

Underlying factors 
It is possible to take advantage of positive drug interactions. However, the negative interactions are usually of more interest because of their pathological significance, and also because they are often unexpected, and may even go undiagnosed. By studying the conditions that favor the appearance of interactions, it should be possible to prevent them or at least diagnose them in time. The factors or conditions that predispose the appearance of interactions include:

 Old age: factors relating to how human physiology changes with age may affect the interaction of drugs. For example, liver metabolism, kidney function, nerve transmission, or the functioning of bone marrow all decrease with age. In addition, in old age, there is a sensory decrease that increases the chances of errors being made in the administration of drugs.
 Polypharmacy: The use of multiple drugs by a single patient, to treat one or more ailments. The more drugs a patient takes the more likely it will be that some of them will interact.
 Genetic factors: Genes synthesize enzymes that metabolize drugs. Some races have genotypic variations that could decrease or increase the activity of these enzymes. The consequence of this would, on occasions, be a greater predisposition towards drug interactions and therefore a greater predisposition for adverse effects to occur. This is seen in genotype variations in the isozymes of cytochrome P450.
 Hepatic or renal diseases: The blood concentrations of drugs that are metabolized in the liver and/or eliminated by the kidneys may be altered if either of these organs is not functioning correctly. If this is the case an increase in blood concentration is normally seen.
 Serious diseases that could worsen if the dose of the medicine is reduced.
 Drug dependent factors:
 Narrow therapeutic index: Where the difference between the effective dose and the toxic dose is small. The drug digoxin is an example of this type of drug.
 Steep dose-response curve: Small changes in the dosage of a drug produce large changes in the drug's concentration in the patient's blood plasma.
 Saturable hepatic metabolism: In addition to dose effects the capacity to metabolize the drug is greatly decreased

Epidemiology
As of 2008, among US adults older than 56, 4% were taking medication and or supplements that put them at risk of a major drug interaction. Potential drug-drug interactions have increased over time and are more common in the less-educated elderly even after controlling for age, sex, place of residence, and comorbidity.

See also 
 Deprescribing
 Cytochrome P450
 Classification of Pharmaco-Therapeutic Referrals
 Drug interactions can be checked for free online with interaction checkers (note that not all drug interaction checkers provide the same results, and only a drug information expert, such as a pharmacist, should interpret results or provide advice on managing drug interactions)
 Multi-Drug Interaction Checker by Medscape 
 Drug Interactions Checker by Drugs.com

Notes

References

Bibliography 
 MA Cos. Interacciones de fármacos y sus implicancias clínicas. In: Farmacología Humana. Chap. 10, pp. 165–176. (J. Flórez y col. Eds). Masson SA, Barcelona. 1997.

External links 
 Drug Interactions: What You Should Know. U.S. Food and Drug Administration, Center for Drug Evaluation and Research, September 2013
COVID 19 Drug interaction check tool University of Liverpool

Clinical pharmacology
Pharmacokinetics